Sailor Moon is a Japanese manga series written and illustrated by Naoko Takeuchi. The series follows the adventures of Usagi Tsukino, a girl who transforms into the titular protagonist and goes on a journey to save the universe from being annihilated. Along the way, she encounters and defeats a diverse group of enemies. The series was published in individual chapters in the monthly manga anthology Nakayoshi, Several adaptations based on Sailor Moon have been made including two anime series and three feature films produced by Toei Animation, as well as a musical series, a live-action television series produced by Toei Company, and a large number of video games.

These chapters were collected by Kodansha in a series of 18 tankōbon volumes; the first released on July 6, 1992, while the last one was released on April 4, 1997. The manga was later rereleased in 12 shinsōban in 2003 under the title Pretty Guardian Sailor Moon to coincide with the release of the live-action series of the same name, with some corrections and updates to the dialogue and artwork. Volume 1 was released on September 22, 2003 and volume 12 released on July 23, 2004.

Volume list

Shinsōban short stories

English publication
The North America distributing company Tokyopop initially released 18 volumes from the Japanese first edition, split into five arcs; Dark Kingdom with fourteen acts, Black Moon with twelve acts, Infinity with twelve acts, Dream with eleven acts, and Stars with eleven acts. Volume 1 was released on December 1, 1998, and volume 18 was released on September 18, 2001. The first 10 acts were also published in the American magazine MixxZine, while acts 39 through 60 were published in Smile. The series was also published in thirty-five issues in traditional American comic book format. This publication was not complete, only containing acts 11 through 38 and the extra "Lover of Princess Kaguya". These were released starting in August 1998 at the San Diego ComicCon through mid-2001. The Mixx and Tokyopop editions of the manga went out of print in 2005.

In 2011, Kodansha USA began re-printing the 14-volume restored Sailor Moon manga edition (including the two short story compilations) under the title Pretty Guardian Sailor Moon, as well as the two-volume restored Codename: Sailor V manga editions in English beginning with Volume 1 of both titles on September 13, 2011, featuring a new translation. Subsequent volumes were published bimonthly.

In 2017, Kodansha USA announced plans to re-release Sailor Moon in an "Eternal Edition", featuring a new English translation, new cover artwork by Takeuchi, and color pages from the manga's original run, printed on extra-large premium paper. The first Eternal Edition volume was published on September 11, 2018; the tenth and final volume was published on October 20, 2020. 

In 2020, Kodansha USA announced plans to re-release the Sailor Moon manga again as part of their "Naoko Takeuchi Collection". The company described the new edition as a "more affordable, portable" version of the Eternal Edition. The first volume was published on April 5, 2022.

References

External links
 Complete list of Sailor Moon media released by Kodansha 

Sailor Moon
Chapters

hu:Parallel Sailor Moon